Alfie is a 2013 Indian short film written and directed by Dr. Thomas Mathai.

Plot summary

Alfie is a failing actress and a junkie lost in filth. One fine afternoon, she and her new lover travel to a remote waterfall inside the woods. Tired with all the walking, she soon falls asleep by the waterfall and the dream that follows is bizarre, horrifying, where she is bound up tight in a shady dungeon and tortured mercilessly.

Visually reminiscent of a Rembrandt, ‘Alfie’ tells a surreal tale structured uniquely to simulate a dream experience, immersed in Freudian eroticism, sexual deviance and biblical notion of Baptism.
Where as it has a second meaning also that is somehow pointing to a fact that women are still objectified by men. The Man on the screen is shown dominating which before climax is tried by women too. But  the man oppresses her and tortures her. During  her last breath she was in her wonderland of dreams and there what she witnessed was only the beauty of nature that she was created to see.

Festival Screenings and Release

Alfie was premiered at short film corner of 2013 Festival de Cannes. It was also screened in the competition section of 6th International Documentary and Short Film Festival of Kerala held in June 2013 at Thiruvananthapuram. A 20-minute version, the dungeon edit was released online via YouTube on 12 December 2013.

References

External links

Indian independent films
2013 films
2010s Malayalam-language films
Indian short films